City-Hochhaus  is 36-story skyscraper in Leipzig, Germany.  At , it is the tallest multistory building in Leipzig and is located proximately of the eastern part of the inner city ring road in Leipzig's district Mitte. The tower was designed by architect Hermann Henselmann in the shape of an open book, and built between 1968 and 1972. It followed Henselmann's idea to cap central places in cities with a prominent tower, such as the Jen-Tower in Jena and Fernsehturm in Berlin.

City-Hochhaus was originally part of the University of Leipzig campus at Augustusplatz, was sold by the state government of Saxony and is now owned by the U.S. investment bank Merrill Lynch. The building was completely renovated between 1999 and 2002, when it lost its aluminium sheathing which was replaced by grey granite. The offices are now rented to private tenants, including the public broadcaster MDR, the European Energy Exchange and a restaurant called 'Panorama'. The roof is equipped with a viewing platform.

The building is nicknamed Weisheitszahn by locals due to its form, or after its previous function, the Uniriese.

Panorama  
Due to the height and location of the house in the city center, it offers a panoramic view of the entire city. Since 1972, the Panorama Café had been on the 26th and 27th floor during the GDR era, but was closed in 1991. In 2002, after the renovation of the house, the new panorama restaurant was opened. The restaurant now operates under the name "Plate of Art". It was redesigned in 2007 according to plans by the architect Rüdiger Renno and the designer Till Brömme.

A staircase leads from the restaurant floor to the open viewing platform on the 31st floor. Only towards the east-southeast does the spire obstruct the view. Among other things, if the air is clear enough, there are Fichtelberg, Auersberg, Kulpenberg, Wurmberg, Brocken, Viktorshöhe and even some Ore Mountains peaks in the Czech Republic (e.g. Jeleni Hora) to see. The platform is a popular tourist destination.

See also
List of tallest buildings in Germany
List of high rise buildings in Leipzig
Oderturm
Jen-Tower
Park Inn Berlin
Fernsehturm Berlin
Kulturfinger

Literature 
 Horst Riedel: City-Hochhaus. In: Stadtlexikon Leipzig von A bis Z. PRO LEIPZIG, Leipzig 2012, ISBN 978-3-936508-82-6, p. 91.
 Wolfgang Hocquél: Leipzig – Architektur von der Romanik bis zur Gegenwart, 1st edition, Passage-Verlag, Leipzig 2001, ISBN 3-932900-54-5, p. 119-121

References

External links
 City-Hochhaus Leipzig Homepage

Buildings and structures in Leipzig
Office buildings completed in 1972
Skyscraper office buildings in Germany